Dorian Gray a.k.a. The Sins of Dorian Gray and The Secret of Dorian Gray is a 1970 film adaptation of Oscar Wilde's 1890 novel The Picture of Dorian Gray starring Helmut Berger.

Directed by Massimo Dallamano and produced by Harry Alan Towers, the film stresses the decadence and eroticism of the story and changes the setting to early 1970s London. The sexual liberation of the late 1960s and early 1970s provides a fitting backdrop for Dorian's escapades in this version, and also the general clothing and fashion style of the era is extrapolated into a 1970s version of the aesthetic, decadent world of the 1890s novel.

Critical opinion of the film is decidedly mixed. On the one hand, some consider the film trash and sexploitation, while others point out that the film was shot at a unique time in the 20th century when a new openness about sexuality and its depiction on film allowed showing scenes only vaguely hinted at in the novel and earlier (and also later) movie adaptations.

A marked difference between this version and the novel is the final scene. Instead of Dorian slicing the painting with the knife (thereby inadvertently killing himself), he is seen committing suicide with the knife deliberately.

Plot

Dorian sirs with his friend Basil and another man, drinking in a London strip club. They split up. Dorian goes to an empty theatre and watches a girl rehearsing the part of Juliet from Romeo and Juliet. He takes her for a hot dog and coffee and they drink water from a fountain. They walk arm in arm through the night.

She takes him back to the theatre and plays a tape of Romeo and Juliet as they make love. The next day she says she was a virgin. He drives her to her parents' house. He goes to see Basil in his riverside studio.

Basil's client Henry Wotton arrives with his sister and wants the picture of Dorian Gray for his gallery. The picture shows him stripped to the waist, wearing a purple scarf. They go outside to speak to Dorian and ironically discuss Oscar Wilde. They debate the demerits of marriage.

Dorian takes the girl to a red-tiled cottage in Windsor Great Park. She runs off saying that he has had other girls there. He catches her and they make love under a huge oak tree.

Cast

See also
 Adaptations of The Picture of Dorian Gray

References

External links
 
 

1970 films
1970 LGBT-related films
West German films
1970 horror films
British LGBT-related films
German LGBT-related films
Italian LGBT-related films
1970s English-language films
English-language German films
English-language Italian films
Films based on The Picture of Dorian Gray
Films set in London
Constantin Film films
1970s British films
1970s Italian films
1970s German films